Villamagna is a village in Tuscany, central Italy, administratively a frazione of the comune of Volterra, province of Pisa. At the time of the 2001 census its population was 220.

Villamagna is about 60 km from Pisa and 15 km from Volterra.

References 

Frazioni of the Province of Pisa